Sawley railway station was a station at Breaston in Derbyshire.

History
It was opened as Breaston in 1839 for the Midland Counties Railway, which shortly joined the North Midland Railway and the Birmingham and Derby Junction Railway to form the Midland Railway.

The third station from Nottingham was soon named Sawley to prevent confusion with Beeston.

It was far from both settlements, and when Draycott  was opened in 1852 and, particularly, Sawley Junction in 1888, it became superfluous and was closed in 1930.

The line is now part of the Midland Main Line between Long Eaton and Derby.

Services

References

Bibliography
The Nottingham and Derby Railway Companion, (1839) Republished 1979 with foreword by J.B.Radford, Derbyshire Record Society
Higginson, M, (1989) The Midland Counties Railway: A Pictorial Survey, Derby: Midland Railway Trust.

Disused railway stations in Derbyshire
Railway stations in Great Britain opened in 1839
Railway stations in Great Britain closed in 1930
Former Midland Railway stations
Borough of Erewash